Alton Roy Welton (March 11, 1886 – November 9, 1958) was an American track and field athlete who competed in the 1908 Summer Olympics. He finished fourth in the Men's Marathon. Welton also competed in the 1908 Boston Marathon, finishing in ninth place.

References

External links
Olympic profile

1886 births
1958 deaths
American male marathon runners
Olympic track and field athletes of the United States
Athletes (track and field) at the 1908 Summer Olympics
20th-century American people